Half Drunk Under a Full Moon is the sixth studio album by Scottish rock band the Fratellis. The album was released on 2 April 2021, having been delayed by a year due to the COVID-19 pandemic.

Background
In contrast to the more rock-oriented music of previous albums, Half Drunk Under a Full Moon features a baroque pop sound with considerable use of brass and strings. Guitarist and vocalist Jon Fratelli had previously sought this approach on their debut album's most successful single, "Chelsea Dagger": "I wasn't mad keen on going down the road of the chant vocals. I really wanted to have a New Orleans big band playing. But Tony Hoffer, our producer, had us doing multiple vocal takes from all around the studio." 

In addition to the album's delay, the COVID-19 pandemic caused multiple cancellations of the supporting tour. This prompted the band to organise a series of small-scale shows at independent record stores, with all proceeds going to the stores themselves and to the band's crew. On 2 April 2021, the band released a non-album cover of Baccara's 1977 single "Yes Sir, I Can Boogie" and donated all proceeds to the Tartan Army Children's Charity, Soccer Aid and the Eilidh Brown Memorial Fund. This was one of two covers released in conjunction with the album, the other being a studio recording of Dion's 1961 single "Runaround Sue" with which the band had been closing concerts for several years.

Track listing

Personnel

The Fratellis
 Jon Fratelli – vocals, guitars, keyboards
 Barry Fratelli – bass
 Mince Fratelli – drums

Additional musicians
 Will Foster – orchestral score 
 Mark Lesseraux - backing vocals 
 Roger J. Manning Jnr - backing vocals 

Production
 Tony Hoffer – production, mixing, programming
 Cameron Lister – engineering
 Dave Cooley – mastering

Additional Personnel
 Manager: Anthony McGill @ Numb Music 

Design
 David Eustace – photography

Charts

References

External links
 Official site

2021 albums
The Fratellis albums
Albums produced by Tony Hoffer